Miyuki Kobayashi (Japanese 小林美幸, born November 10, 1967) is a Japanese sprint canoer who competed in the late 1980s and early 1990s. At the 1988 Summer Olympics in Seoul, she was eliminated in the repechages of the K-2 500 m while withdrawing prior to the heats of the K-1 500 m event. Four years later in Barcelona, Kobayashi was eliminated in the semifinals of the K-2 500 m event.

External links
Sports-Reference.com profile

1967 births
Canoeists at the 1988 Summer Olympics
Canoeists at the 1992 Summer Olympics
Japanese female canoeists
Living people
Olympic canoeists of Japan
Asian Games medalists in canoeing
Canoeists at the 1990 Asian Games
Canoeists at the 1994 Asian Games
Medalists at the 1990 Asian Games
Medalists at the 1994 Asian Games
Asian Games silver medalists for Japan
Asian Games bronze medalists for Japan